Thyenula vulnifica is a jumping spider species in the genus Thyenula that lives in South Africa.

References

Endemic fauna of South Africa
Salticidae
Spiders described in 2014
Spiders of South Africa